The Wang clan of Langya (or Langye) was a Chinese clan which gained political prominence during the Han Dynasty and became one of the most powerful non-imperial clans during the Eastern Jin period.

History

Jin dynasty

During the Western Jin period, Wang Rong was a prominent scion of the clan, reaching the rank of Situ. He was also the youngest member of the Seven Sages of the Bamboo Grove.

After the Disaster of Yongjia, when the Jin capital of Luoyang was sacked by Former Zhao forces, the Langya Wang clan, led by the brothers Wang Dao and Wang Dun, played an instrumental role in the preservation of the Jin dynasty, accompanying the future Emperor Yuan of Jin in leaving Luoyang and heading south to Jiankang (modern day Nanjing). Such was their influence in ensuring stability during the transition from Western to Eastern Jin, and in managing both local rebellions and the interests of refugee clans fleeing from the north, that it was said that "All Under Heaven is jointly ruled by the Wang and Sima clans" (王与马，共天下).

Prominent members

 Wang Rong (234–305), politician during the Western Jin
 Wang Dao (276–339), politician during the Eastern Jin
 Wang Dun (266–324), military commander during the Eastern Jin
 Wang Xizhi (303–361), writer and calligrapher; the Lantingji Xu is generally attributed to him. Nephew of Wang Dao.
 Wang Xianzhi (344–386), son of Wang Xizhi, calligrapher

References

Chinese clans
Jin dynasty (266–420) people
People from Linyi